The New Zealand cricket team toured England in the 1958 season. In a notably wet summer when the touring side lost the equivalent of 29 full days of cricket, the side lost four of the five Test matches (and would probably have lost the other had rain not ruined the match). In first-class matches, they won six of their first nine games, but then won only one more all season, although they only lost two matches outside the Tests, both of them to Surrey.

The background
New Zealand's first tour of England for nine years saw what was probably the weakest of the Test-playing nations taking on the side that could probably claim to be the strongest. In home series England had successively beaten Australia and the West Indies, and a combination of fast bowling from Brian Statham, Fred Trueman and others, spin bowling from Jim Laker and Tony Lock, and apparently reliable batting led by captain Peter May, Colin Cowdrey and Tom Graveney had made them a formidable side.

By contrast, New Zealand had undoubted batting class in Bert Sutcliffe, a determined captain in all-rounder John Reid, and some relatively unknown and untried players alongside a few reliable stalwarts who had played across the 1950s. The preceding years had seen New Zealand finally achieve its first-ever Test victory, and previous New Zealand sides in England had often raised their game in the big matches (though even Tests in the previous tours had been restricted to just three or four days).

The New Zealand touring team 
The side was captained by John Reid who, with Bert Sutcliffe, Harry Cave and John Hayes, were the four players who remained from the successful 1949 New Zealand team. Jack Phillipps was also returning for a second visit to England as tour manager.

The full side was:

John Reid (captain)
Bert Sutcliffe (vice-captain)
Jack Alabaster
Bob Blair
Harry Cave
John D'Arcy
Noel Harford
John Hayes
Tony MacGibbon
Trevor Meale
Lawrie Miller
Alex Moir
Eric Petrie (wicketkeeper)
Bill Playle
John Sparling
John Ward (wicketkeeper)

Of the 16 players, 11 had previously played Test cricket: the five newcomers were D'Arcy, Meale, Playle, Sparling and Ward, and of these five, all except Ward played in the Tests during this tour.

The tour

The New Zealand top order was poor, D'Arcy, Playle, Harford and Miller scoring only 325 runs between them in the Tests at an average of 9.28; of the four only Playle played Test cricket again. In the Second Test at Lord's, despite scoring only 269 in the first innings, England won by an innings and 148 runs. In the Third Test at Leeds, England declared its first innings at 267 for 2, and won by an innings and 71 runs. The English spinner Tony Lock finished the series with 34 wickets at an average of 7.47.

The all-rounder Tony MacGibbon was New Zealand's highest scorer in the series, but he scored only 175 runs at an average of 19.44; he was also the highest wicket-taker with 20 at 19.45, nobody else taking more than six. In the first three Tests, the highest individual New Zealand innings was 39, by MacGibbon, with D'Arcy's 33 the only other score above 26. In the last two Tests, MacGibbon, Sparling and Reid each hit a fifty.

Outside the Tests, Reid hit three first-class centuries, 1282 runs and averaged 47.48, as well as bowling and catching effectively. Wisden chose him as one of its Cricketers of the Year, noting among other things that he "led the side cheerfully".

Test series summary

First Test

Second Test

Third Test

Fourth Test

Fifth Test

References

Annual reviews
Playfair Cricket Annual 1959.
Wisden Cricketers' Almanack 1959.

External links
 New Zealand in England, 1958 at Cricinfo
 New Zealand in British Isles 1958 at CricketArchive
 New Zealand to England 1958 at Test Cricket Tours
 Andy Zaltzman, "Unpredictability" at Cricinfo

1958 in English cricket
1958 in New Zealand cricket
June 1958 sports events in the United Kingdom
July 1958 sports events in the United Kingdom
August 1958 sports events in the United Kingdom
International cricket competitions from 1945–46 to 1960
1958